Garfield Gets a Life is a 1991 animated television special based on the Garfield comic strip written by Jim Davis. It features Lorenzo Music as the voice of Garfield. The special was first broadcast May 8, 1991 on CBS. It was nominated for Outstanding Animated Program at the 43rd Primetime Emmy Awards. It was the final in the series of twelve Garfield television specials, in spite of the success of Garfield and Friends as CBS cancelled new animated specials in 1990. It is the only CBS Garfield special directed by John Sparey instead of Phil Roman, although the latter served as producer.

Unlike the other Garfield specials, despite the title, Garfield Gets a Life focuses mainly on Jon rather than the titular fat cat. Odie only appears twice in this special. It has been released on both VHS and DVD home video.

The songs "Monday Morning Blues (Blues for Mr. G)" (performed by B.B. King) and "Shake Your Paw" (performed by The Temptations) were released on the 1991 album Am I Cool or What?. An instrumental version of the opening theme, under the title "Spare Time" (performed by David Benoit), was also released on the album.

Plot 
On a dull Monday morning, Jon Arbuckle realizes how uneventful his life is and sets out to change it. He goes out to various locales to meet girls, but is turned down by every one. At home, Jon watches an advertisement on TV for the Lorenzo School for the Personality Impaired and chooses to attend. There, he meets a girl named Mona, and the two like each other and go to Jon's house. There, Garfield is worried about Jon being in a relationship and goes to tell him. Mona begins sneezing and Jon learns that she is allergic to cats. Jon chooses to stay with Garfield, but he agrees to stay friends with Mona, and the two go out to dinner as Garfield follows them.

Cast 
 Lorenzo Music - Garfield
 Thom Huge - Jon Arbuckle
 Gregg Berger - Odie / Stinky / Announcer
 Julie Payne - Library Girl / Receptionist
 Frank Welker - Lorenzo / Gunner
 June Foray - Mona / Librarian
 Kim Campbell - Woman at Laundromat
 Kevin Campbell - Man #1

Uncredited 
 Gregg Berger - Man #2
 Thom Huge - Ranger
 Frank Welker - Station Announcer

References

External links 
 
 

Garfield television specials
1990s American television specials
1990s animated television specials
1990s American animated films
1991 television specials
1991 in American television
Film Roman television specials
American animated short films
1990s animated short films
1991 animated films
1991 films
Television shows written by Jim Davis (cartoonist)
1990s English-language films